Cyperus steadii is a species of sedge that is endemic to parts of Iran and Pakistan.

The species was first formally described by the botanist Georg Kükenthal in 1931.

See also
 List of Cyperus species

References

steadii
Taxa named by Georg Kükenthal
Plants described in 1931
Flora of Pakistan
Flora of Iran